Tetanops is a genus of picture-winged flies in the family Ulidiidae.

Species
Subgenus Eurycephalomyia Hendel, 1907
Tetanops sintenisi Becker, 1909
Subgenus Tetanops Fallén, 1820
Tetanops contarinii Rondani, 1869
Tetanops corsicana Becker, 1909
Tetanops flavescens Macquart, 1835
Tetanops laticeps Loew, 1868
Tetanops myopina Fallén, 1820
Tetanops psammophila Loew, 1862

Others:
 Tetanops apicalis
 Tetanops cazieri
 Tetanops eryngii
 Tetanops impunctata
 Tetanops integer
 Tetanops luridipennis
 Tetanops magdalenae
 Tetanops myopaeformis
 Tetanops parallelus
 Tetanops rufifrons
 Tetanops vittifrons

References

 
Ulidiidae
Brachycera genera
Taxa named by Carl Fredrik Fallén